Doc Stearn...Mr. Monster is a comic book featuring a superhero created by Michael T. Gilbert, most recently published by Dark Horse Comics. The character first appeared in Pacific Comics Vanguard Illustrated #7 (July 1984). Later the character graduated to his own monthly series Doc Stearn...Mr. Monster from Eclipse Comics.

Mr. Monster was derived from an old 1940s character created by Fred Kelly who appeared only twice in 1940s Canadian comic books (Triumph Comics #31, 1946, and Super-Duper Comics #3, 1947). After trademarking Mr. Monster, Gilbert heavily revised the character, creating a horror/humor hybrid which often featured heavy satire of both the horror genre and superhero comics in general.

Publication history
 Vanguard Illustrated #7 (Pacific Comics). July 1984.
 Doc Stearn...Mr. Monster #1-10 (Eclipse Comics). 1985–1987. Issues 1-5 collected as Mr. Monster: His Books of Forbidden Knowledge Vol. 1 (Marlowe & Company). 1996.
 Mr. Monster's Super Duper Special #1-8 (Eclipse Comics). 1986–1987.
 Airboy #28 (prologue to Airboy and Mr. Monster, Eclipse Comics). August 1987.
 Airboy and Mr. Monster one-shot (Eclipse Comics). August 1987.
 Mighty Mites V.2 #2 (Eternity Comics). September 1987.
 Wacky Squirrel Halloween Adventure Special one-shot (Dark Horse Comics). 1987.
 Dark Horse Presents #14, 20, 28, 33 (Dark Horse Comics). 1988-1989.
 Doc Stearn...Mr. Monster #1-8 (Dark Horse Comics). 1988-1990. Collected with revisions as Mr. Monster: Origins (Graphitti Designs). 1996.
 Mr. Monster Attacks #1-3 (Tundra). 1992.
 Mr. Monster's 3-D Triple Threat one-shot (Atlas). 1993.
 Penthouse Max #3 (Penthouse). 1996.
 Mr. Monster Presents: Crack-a-Boom! #1-3 (Caliber). 1997.
 Mr. Monster Vs. Gorzilla One-Shot (Image Comics). 1998.
 Mr. Monster's Gal Friday Kelly #1-3 (Image Comics). 2000.
 Mr. Monster: His Books of Forbidden Knowledge Vol. 0. (TwoMorrows). 2001. Reprints all Mr. Monster stories from Dark Horse Presents (v. 1), as well as material from Crack-a-Boom! #s 1 and 2, Hero Illustrated #11, Trencher X-Mas Bites Special #1, and Mr. Monster Attacks! #2, along with new material.
 Mr. Monster: Worlds War Two (Atomeka). 2004. Reprints Penthouse Max #3.
 Mr. Monster: Who Watches the Garbagemen? (Atomeka). 2005. Reprints stories from Mr. Monster (Eclipse) #s 3 and 6, Mr. Monster Attacks! #1, and Mr. Monster's Gal Friday Kelly #3, along with new material.
 Dark Horse Presents vol. 2 #1-3, 17, 27-30, 33-35 (Dark Horse Comics). 2011-2014.
 YEET Presents #34 and #36 (Cost Of Paper Comics). 2020.

References

External links

Mr. Monster at Don Markstein's Toonopedia. Archived from the original on March 10, 2016.

Comics characters introduced in 1984
Caliber Comics titles
Dark Horse Comics titles
Dark Horse Comics superheroes
Eclipse Comics titles
Eclipse Comics superheroes
Image Comics titles
Image Comics superheroes
Pacific Comics titles
Tundra Publishing titles
Fantasy comics
Horror comics